Same-sex marriage in Switzerland has been legal since 1 July 2022. Legislation to open marriage to same-sex couples passed the Swiss Parliament in December 2020. The law was challenged in a referendum on 26 September 2021 by opponents of same-sex marriage and was approved with the support of 64% of voters and a majority in all 26 cantons. The law went into force on 1 July 2022. A provision of the law permitting same-sex marriages performed abroad to be recognised in Switzerland took effect on 1 January 2022.

Switzerland allowed registered partnerships for same-sex couples from 1 January 2007, following a 2005 referendum. These partnerships provided most, but not all, of the rights and benefits of marriage. Entering into new partnerships is no longer possible as of 1 July 2022.

Registered partnerships

In a nationwide referendum on 5 June 2005, Swiss voters approved a registered partnership law by 58%, granting same-sex couples the same rights and protections as married couples in terms of next of kin status, taxation, social security, insurance, and shared possession of a dwelling. However, same-sex couples would not have the same rights in terms of joint adoption of children, access to fertility treatments, and facilitated Swiss naturalisation of the foreign partner. Swiss law provides a faster route to citizenship for the spouse of a Swiss citizen, but did not recognise same-sex marriages conducted in foreign countries, instead classing them as registered partnerships.

The official title of the same-sex union is eingetragene Partnerschaft in German, partenariat enregistré in French, unione domestica registrata in Italian, and partenadi registrà in Romansh. The bill was passed by the National Council, 118 to 50, on 3 December 2003, and by the Council of States on 3 June 2004 by 33 votes to 5, with minor changes. The National Council approved it again on 18 June, by a vote of 112 to 51, but the conservative Federal Democratic Union collected signatures to force a referendum. Subsequently, the Swiss people voted 58% in favor of the bill on 5 June 2005. The law came into effect on 1 January 2007. Switzerland was the first nation to pass a same-sex union law by referendum.

At the end of August 2008, the Federal Supreme Court ruled that long-term same-sex partners were entitled to the same vested benefits from the pension of the deceased as equivalent opposite-sex partners have. A shared apartment is not necessary.

The ability to enter into a registered partnership was closed off on 1 July 2022. No further partnerships are granted in Switzerland, and couples may retain their status as registered partners or convert their union into a recognized marriage.

Adoption and parenting
Article 27 of the partnership law treats the matter of the partner's child(ren). The law states that the partner of the biological or adoptive parent must provide financial support for their partner's child and also possesses the full legal authority to represent the child in every matter as being the parent's partner. It also states that in the case of the dissolution of the partnership, the ex-partner has the right to keep close ties with the child. This gives couples a real role in being parents.

In 2010, Swiss LGBT organisations started a petition, "Same Chances For All Families", demanding more adoption rights. On 30 September 2011, the National Council considered the petition but ultimately voted 83–97 against it. However, the debate and close vote provided a view on how attitudes on the issue had changed, as for example, Maja Ingold, MP for the Evangelical People's Party, spoke for more recognition of gay and lesbian parents, although her party had campaigned against the registered partnership law in 2005. It became clear that, while there was no majority for full joint adoption, allowing adoption of the partner's child (i.e. stepchild adoption) could gather majority support in Parliament.

The Council of States accepted the petition and the Legal Affairs Committee approved a motion from MP Claude Janiak backing the right to full joint adoption regardless of marital status or sexual orientation. In November 2011, the committee voted unanimously in favour, including members of the conservative Swiss People's Party. In February 2012, the Federal Council responded by informing the Council of States that they were in favour of stepchild adoption but against full joint adoption rights. On 14 March 2012, the Council of States approved (21–19) the full extension of adoption rights to same-sex couples regardless of marital status or sexual orientation. As the National Council had originally voted against it in September 2011, the bill had to be voted on again by the chamber, which did so on 13 December 2012, as it voted 113–64 to grant a person in a registered partnership the right to adopt biological or adopted children that their partner had before the start of the partnership. However, the motion granting full adoption rights approved by the Council of States was rejected by the National Council. On 4 March 2013, the new version approved by the National Council on 13 December was accepted by the Council of States by a majority of 26–16.

In November 2014, taking into account the parliamentary votes, the Federal Council approved allowing the adoption of the partner's child as part of a larger adoption reform. The bill would permit registered partners and cohabiting couples, both same-sex and different-sex, to petition to adopt, and would also lower the minimum age to adopt from 35 to 28. The legislation had to be approved by Parliament, though opponents had already announced they would force an optional referendum. For such a referendum to occur, citizens opposing the law had to gather 50,000 signatures within 100 days. In January 2016, the Council of States' Legal Affairs Committee voted 7 to 3 with one abstention to approve the bill. On 8 March 2016, the Council of States voted 25–14 in favor. Federal Councillor Simonetta Sommaruga expressed her support for the bill and argued that it was necessary to legally protect children already raised by same-sex couples. On 13 May 2016, the National Council's Legal Affairs Committee voted 15–9 to approve the bill. The following day, it was approved by the National Council in a 113–64 vote. Differing texts caused the two chambers to agree on a final, slightly modified version of the bill that was passed in Parliament on 17 June 2016 by a vote of 125–68 with 3 abstentions. Following the final vote in Parliament, a referendum committee was established including members of several different political parties with the aim of forcing a referendum on the bill. No major party supported the committee. On 4 October 2016, it was confirmed that the referendum would not take place as only 20,000 signatures had been collected. The law took effect on 1 January 2018.

Statistics
The first same-sex partnership was registered on 2 January 2007 in the Italian-speaking canton of Ticino. By the end of 2021, 12,133 same-sex partnerships had taken place in Switzerland.

Most partnerships were performed in the canton of Zürich at 3,725, followed by Vaud (1,322), Bern (1,255), Geneva (1,104), Aargau (644), Basel-Stadt (485), St. Gallen (421), Lucerne (409), Basel-Landschaft (402), Ticino (332), Fribourg (325), Valais (289), Solothurn (275), Thurgau (250), Neuchâtel (174), Zug (157), Schwyz (130), Graubünden (129), Schaffhausen (88), Jura (55), Appenzell Ausserrhoden (46), Glarus (29), Nidwalden (28), Obwalden (24), Uri (22), and Appenzell Innerrhoden (13).

Cantonal laws

Cohabitation
Certain Swiss cantonal constitutions recognise and guarantee the right to cohabit and to found a family outside of marriage for both different-sex and same-sex couples; these include among others the constitutions of Vaud, Zürich, Appenzell Ausserrhoden, Basel-Stadt, Bern, Geneva, Zug, Schaffhausen, and Fribourg.

Registered partnerships
The canton of Geneva has had a partnership law on a cantonal level since 2001. It grants unmarried couples, both same-sex and opposite-sex, many of the same rights, responsibilities and protections as married couples. However, it does not allow benefits in taxation, social security, or health insurance premiums (unlike the federal law). The law is based on the French civil solidarity pact. In autumn 2016, the Department of Public Instruction of Geneva introduced new forms in schools allowing same-sex parents to be recognized; the previous forms with boxes for "father" and "mother" were replaced with two boxes listing "parents".

On 22 September 2002, the canton of Zürich passed a same-sex partnership law by referendum (62.7% in favor) that goes further than Geneva's law, but requires couples to live together for six months before registering.

In July 2004, the Grand Council of Neuchâtel passed a law recognizing unmarried couples, with 65 votes to 38.

Registered partnerships for same-sex couples are recognized in the Constitution of the canton of Fribourg. In May 2004, voters approved the Constitution with 58.03% in favor and 41.97% against. It took effect on 1 January 2005. Article 14(2) states: "The right to register a partnership for same-sex couples is guaranteed".

Marriage
On 6 June 2016, the Cantonal Council of Zürich rejected by a vote of 110–52 a proposal that would have defined marriage as "a union between one man and one woman" in the Constitution of Zürich. The proposal, introduced by the Federal Democratic Union (EDU/UDF), sought to constitutionally ban same-sex marriage in the canton. EDU and most members of the Swiss People's Party were in favor of the measure, while all other parties, including the Christian Democratic People's Party and the Evangelical People's Party, were opposed. The EDU subsequently gathered 6,000 signatures to force a cantonal referendum on the issue. The referendum took place on 27 November 2016, where the proposal was overwhelmingly rejected; 80.9% voted against it, while 19.1% voted in favor. Voters in Zürich's Aussersihl and Industriequartier districts voted "No" by more than 92%. All municipalities rejected the proposal.

Same-sex marriage

In 2012, Parliament requested that the executive Swiss Federal Council examine how to update family law to reflect changes in society. In March 2015, the council released its governmental report about marriage and new rights for families, raising the possibility of the introduction of registered partnerships for straight couples and marriage for gay and lesbian couples. Federal Councillor Simonetta Sommaruga, in charge of the Federal Department of Justice and Police, also stated she hoped that gay and lesbian couples would soon be allowed to marry.

Political parties and support
Same-sex marriage is supported by the Green Party (GPS/PES), the Conservative Democratic Party (BDP/PBD), the Social Democratic Party (SP/PS), the Green Liberal Party (glp/pvl), the Swiss Party of Labour (PdA/PST-POP), The Liberals (FDP/PLR), the Christian Democratic People's Party (CVP/PDC), and Solidarity. The Swiss People's Party (SVP/UDC), the Evangelical People's Party (EVP/PEV), the Ticino League and the Federal Democratic Union (EDU/UDF) are mostly opposed. In 2017, the CVP president, Gerhard Pfister, said he believed that around two-thirds of CVP lawmakers opposed same-sex marriage. However, a 2019 survey showed that about 83% of CVP candidates running in the October 2019 federal election were in favour of same-sex marriage. The same survey showed that 48% of SVP candidates were in favour. In April 2018, the women's wing of The Liberals voted by 56 votes to 2 to support same-sex marriage. On 26 January 2019, the national Swiss People's Party adopted a new party programme. A proposal to strike the party's opposition to same-sex marriage was rejected by the delegates with a vote of 166 to 126.

During a 2019 public consultation on the legalisation of same-sex marriage, the governments of Geneva, Vaud, Zürich, Bern, Basel-Stadt, Basel-Landschaft, Aargau, Luzern, Valais, Schaffhausen, Graubünden, Ticino, Fribourg, Neuchâtel, St. Gallen, Solothurn, Jura, Glarus, Appenzell Ausserrhoden, Zug, Uri and Thurgau expressed support for the opening of marriage to same-sex couples, while the governments of Schwyz, Nidwalden, Appenzell Innerrhoden and Obwalden expressed opposition. Several organisations and associations also came out in support, including LGBT and feminist groups, Operation Libero, the National Ethics Committee, ProFamilia CH, the Swiss Psychological Society, and religious groups such as the Old Catholic Church, the Protestant Church of Switzerland and the Swiss Federation of Jewish Communities. Opposition was found mainly among pro-life and religious groups, including the Episcopal Conference of Switzerland.

On 15 August 2019, Gottfried Locher, president of the Protestant Church of Switzerland, declared his personal support for same-sex marriage. In November 2019, the Protestant Church voted to support the opening of marriage to same-sex couples. This followed a June 2019 statement from the church, "We are created by God. We cannot choose our sexual orientation. We perceive it as an expression of creative fullness."

Popular initiative "For the couple and the family"
In 2011, the Christian Democratic People's Party (CVP/PDC) began gathering signatures for a popular initiative entitled "For the couple and the family - No to the penalty of marriage". This initiative sought to amend article 14 of the Swiss Federal Constitution to equalise fiscal rights and social security benefits between married couples and unmarried cohabiting couples. However, the text would have also introduced a definition of marriage for the first time, specifically the "sole union between a man and a woman". Under Swiss law, cohabiting unmarried couples are entitled to two full pensions. However, the pension of married couples is limited to 150% of the maximum pension per person, meaning that if both partners earn relatively well during their working life, they receive only one and a half times the maximum pension instead of two full pensions.

In November 2012, signature gathering ended and the initiative was submitted. The Federal Council reviewed the initiative and decided to support it, formally asking Parliament in October 2013 to recommend that voters approve the initiative. On 10 December 2014, the National Council discussed the initiative. The Greens proposed to amend the bill stating that "any forms of unions" could not be penalised and the Green Liberals proposed to amend the bill so that "marriage and all the other forms of union defined by the law" could not be penalised. The debate opposed mainly the Swiss People's Party and the Christian Democrats to the Green Liberals, the Greens, the Social Democrats and the Conservative Democrats. The Liberals were mostly divided on the issue. The Swiss People's Party and the Christian Democrats stated their opposition to "any form of homophobia". On the other hand, the opposing parties highlighted the discrimination that would be introduced by the initiative and called for a future definition of marriage that would include same-sex couples. Some MPs called the Christian Democrats a "retrograde" party.

After having rejected both counter-propositions from the Greens and the Green Liberals, the National Council finally approved a suggestion from the Commission for Economic Affairs and Taxation, which retained the spirit of the initiative but removed the definition of marriage as exclusively between a man and a woman. This counter-proposition was approved 102–86, thus rejecting the popular initiative and recommending to the Swiss electorate to reject the initiative and accept the counter-proposition. The Council of States approved the counter-proposition on 4 March 2015 in a 24–19 vote. The debate in the upper house also mainly focused on the definition of marriage, though the idea of equal fiscal rights and equal social security benefits between married couples and unmarried cohabiting couples was unopposed. A few Liberal members changed their mind, and the counter-proposition was rejected in the Council of States in a later vote. A subsequent conciliation conference in June 2015 of both chambers of Parliament decided to recommend rejecting the original initiative. On 19 June 2015, the formal order of Parliament recommending voters to reject the initiative was published. On 17 November 2015, the Federal Council also recommended rejecting the initiative. It had supported the initiative two years earlier, but now was obliged to change its position because Parliament was opposed.

Referendum
The Christian Democrats' proposal was put to a referendum on 28 February 2016, with voters deciding whether to define marriage as a "durable cohabitation of a man and a woman" that "must not be disadvantaged in comparison of other lifestyles", thus prohibiting same-sex marriage in the Swiss Federal Constitution. Amongst parliamentary parties, the Christian Democrats (apart from the Young Christian Democrats of Zürich and Geneva, which had declared opposition to the initiative of their parent party), the national-conservative Swiss People's Party and the conservative Evangelical People's Party campaigned for a "Yes" vote. Meanwhile, the Social Democrats, the Liberals, the Greens, the Conservative Democrats and the Green Liberals opposed the text and campaigned for a "No" vote, along with Amnesty International Switzerland, Economiesuisse, the Swiss Federation of Trade Unions and Operation Libero. A month before the vote, various polls showed 67% support (22 January 2016) and 53% support (17 February 2016). The majority of the cantons approved the initiative (16.5 to 6.5), with the cantons of Geneva, Vaud, Bern, Zürich, Grisons, Basel-Stadt, Basel-Landschaft and Appenzell Ausserrhoden opposing the initiative.

During the referendum campaign, the Swiss Government informed voters that about 80,000 married couples were paying more tax than unmarried cohabiting couples, but later admitted that the true figure was almost half a million. The Christian Democratic Party filed a complaint in June 2018. On 10 April 2019, the referendum was declared invalid by the Federal Supreme Court, which ordered a re-vote. Days later, it was reported that a majority of the parliamentary bloc of the Christian Democratic Party opposed the initiative in its current form and wanted the definition of marriage to be removed. According to the Tages-Anzeiger, the party was hoping that the Parliament would propose an alternative measure to eliminate the tax discrimination against married couples, so the party could withdraw its initiative without losing face.

It was subsequently reported that the referendum would not be rerun as the Federal Council could either set a date for a new referendum, or establish a new law to go through the Federal Parliament. In the latter scenario, the Christian Democrats would have had the opportunity to withdraw their initiative, which was the party's preferred option. The vice-president of the party, Charles Juillard, said, "The party is ready to withdraw its initiative if the Federal Council puts an end to the tax penalty of marriage and the discrimination of spouses vis-à-vis the AVS [Old-age and survivors' insurance]." In early January 2020, the party chose to withdraw its initiative and announced it would begin collecting signatures for a second popular initiative. This initiative would again seek to equalise fiscal rights and social security benefits between married couples and unmarried cohabiting couples, but, unlike the previous one, it would not introduce a specific definition of marriage.

Parliamentary initiative "Marriage for All"

Parliamentary deliberations 
The first legislative proposal to legalise same-sex marriage was introduced by Greens MP Ruth Genner in December 1998. The National Council tabled the measure in December 1999.

In December 2013, the Green Liberal Party submitted a parliamentary initiative, "Marriage for All", for a constitutional amendment to legalise same-sex marriage. On 20 February 2015, the Committee for Legal Affairs of the National Council voted to proceed with the initiative, by 12 votes to 9 with 1 abstention. A petition supporting the measure was launched in May 2015. The signatures were submitted to the Legal Affairs Committee of the Council of States before it discussed the proposal, hoping to persuade the committee members to support it. On 1 September 2015, the committee voted by 7 votes to 5 to proceed with the initiative. The National Council's Legal Affairs Committee was then tasked to draft an act within two years (per Article 111 of the Constitution), i.e. by 2017. However, due to the complexity of the legal reform, it proposed on 11 May 2017 to extend the initiative's deadline by another two years (i.e. by 2019) and ask the government administration for further study of the issue. A minority consisting of the Swiss People's Party (SVP/UDC) wanted to block the initiative. On 16 June 2017, the National Council voted by 118–71 in favour of the committee's proposal to extend the deadline to 2019.

The Legal Affairs Committee published its report on 17 May 2018, the International Day Against Homophobia. The committee recommended amending the Swiss Civil Code to remove the heterosexual definition of marriage and insert a gender-neutral definition. It also recommended amendments to the 1953 civil registration law, which defined marriage as being between a man and a woman, as well as to other laws, including laws relating to naturalisation. According to the committee and the Federal Department of Justice and Police, the proposal would automatically legalise joint adoption by married same-sex couples. As such, the committee recommended no changes to adoption law, which allows married couples to adopt without explicitly defining the term "marriage". On 6 July 2018, the committee voted against rejecting the initiative altogether, by 18–1, and subsequently voted to recommend the Federal Parliament to approve the initiative by 14 votes to 11. The committee concluded that the legalisation of same-sex marriage did not require amending the Swiss Federal Constitution, and that it could be achieved through changes to statutory law. Therefore, the Swiss electorate would not necessarily be called to vote on the initiative (though opponents could still force a referendum on the issue, which would require a simple majority of those voting to succeed). Despite opposition from LGBT groups, the committee decided not to include the right of lesbian couples to access assisted reproductive technology so that the initiative would have a higher chance of approval. In early July 2018, Operation Libero began collecting signatures in favour of same-sex marriage to persuade Parliament to legalise it, collecting 30,000 signatures within a week.

On 14 February 2019, the committee approved the bill to allow same-sex marriage by 19 to 4 with one abstention. It was sent out for public consultation. The bill would end registered partnerships, and couples would be able to convert their partnership into marriage. The consultation started on 14 March and lasted until 21 June 2019. It showed wide support for the legalisation of same-sex marriage among all main political parties, with the exception of the Swiss People's Party, and among 22 of the 26 cantonal governments.

In January 2020, the Federal Council expressed its support for the same-sex marriage bill. On 11 June 2020, the National Council approved the bill with amendments allowing access to fertility treatments for lesbian couples in a 132–52 vote. The bill was supported by the Social Democrats, the Liberals, the Greens, the Green Liberals and the Conservative Democrats, while the Swiss People's Party was mostly opposed. The Christian Democrats announced they would support the bill if access to fertility treatments for lesbian couples was excluded. The bill passed the Council of States on 1 December 2020 with some minor amendments concerning fertility treatments, by a vote of 22–15 with 7 abstentions. It narrowly defeated, 22 to 20, a motion that would have required a constitutional amendment (which would have delayed the bill by years and mandated a referendum requiring a double majority of the people and the cantons). On 9 December, the National Council approved the changes made by the Council of States by 133 votes to 57 with 1 abstention. The final vote in both chambers took place on 18 December 2020. The Council of States approved the bill by 24 votes to 11 with 7 abstentions, and the National Council approved it by 136 votes to 48 with 9 abstentions.

Referendum 

In Switzerland's system of semi-direct democracy, a statute is subject to a popular referendum if opponents collect 50,000 signatures demanding one within three months. The right-wing Federal Democratic Union (EDU/UDF), supported by politicians from the Swiss People's Party and the Christian Democratic People's Party, collected 61,027 signatures with the slogan "Yes to marriage and family, no to marriage for everyone". The Federal Chancellery validated the signatures on 27 April. In response to the announcement that opponents had gathered the necessary signatures, Operation Libero collected more than 100,000 signatures in support of same-sex marriage by late April 2021.

The referendum, in which passage of the bill required a simple majority of the popular vote, took place on Sunday, 26 September 2021. 64.1% of voters and all cantons supported the amendment. The vote made Switzerland the 30th country to introduce same-sex marriage, and one of the last in Western Europe.

Federal Councillor Karin Keller-Sutter announced in a press conference later that Sunday evening that the legislation adopted in the referendum would enter into force on 1 July 2022. The first weddings of same-sex couples took place on that date.

The legislation amended article 94 of the Swiss Civil Code to read:
 in German: 
 in French: 
 in Italian: 
 in Romansh: 
(To be able to marry, the prospective spouses must have reached 18 years of age and have the capacity of judgement)

Provisions of the same-sex marriage law relating to the recognition of foreign marriages came into force on 1 January 2022. Same-sex couples who have married abroad will now have their union recognized as a marriage rather than a registered partnership.

Religious performance 
In 2019, the Protestant Church of Switzerland voted to support the opening of civil marriage for same-sex couples, with its executive council voting 45–10 in favor. A majority of member churches allow same-sex marriages to be blessed in their places of worship, including those of the cantons of Aargau, Appenzell, Basel-Landschaft, Basel-Stadt, Fribourg, Geneva, Glarus, Graubünden, Lucerne, Neuchâtel, Nidwalden, Obwalden, St. Gallen, Schaffhausen, Schwyz, Thurgau, Ticino, Valais, Vaud, Zürich, and Zug. Pastors are under no obligation to bless same-sex unions if this would contravene their personal beliefs. The Reformed Churches of the Canton Bern-Jura-Solothurn will allow its clergy to officiate at same-sex marriages from mid-2023. Some other member churches, including the Evangelical-Reformed Church of the Canton of Solothurn, the Evangelical Free Church of Geneva and the Evangelical Reformed Church of Uri do not allow their clergy to officiate at same-sex weddings.

In August 2020, the Christian Catholic Church of Switzerland voted to allow its priests to perform same-sex marriages in its churches. The measure went into force on 1 July 2022, the same day same-sex marriage became legal in Switzerland. The church has also allowed its priests to bless same-sex partnerships since 2007.

The Catholic Church opposes same-sex marriage. In June 2019, the Swiss Union of Catholic Women voted to support the introduction of civil same-sex marriage. In May 2021, the Catholic News Agency reported that Catholic churches in Zürich had joined churches in many German cities in blessing same-sex couples, in ceremonies known as "blessing services for lovers".

The Swiss Federation of Jewish Communities, an umbrella organisation representing a majority of Switzerland's Jewish communities, voted to support civil same-sex marriage in 2019 as a matter of "personal freedom and individual autonomy", while also stating that a religious marriage under Jewish law could only be between heterosexual couples. Reform Jewish organisations also support civil same-sex marriages.

Public opinion
According to an Ifop poll conducted in May 2013, 63% of the Swiss public supported allowing same-sex couples to marry and adopt children. After the Legal Affairs Committee's decision to approve same-sex marriage, two opinion polls released on 22 February 2015 showed support of 54% (Léger for Blick) and 71% (gfs group for the SonntagsZeitung) for allowing same-sex couples to marry and adopt children.

A poll carried out between April and May 2016 showed that 69% of the Swiss population supported same-sex marriage, 25% opposed and 6% were unsure. 94% of Green voters, 59% of voters from the Swiss People's Party and 63% of Christian Democratic voters supported it.

A poll by Tamedia conducted on 5 and 6 December 2017 found that 45% of the Swiss population supported both same-sex marriage and adoption, 27% supported only same-sex marriage, 3% supported only same-sex adoption and 24% were against both. The poll thus found a 72% majority in favour of same-sex marriage. Green, Social Democratic and Green Liberal voters were the most supportive: 88% in favour, 9% against and 3% undecided. 76% of Liberal voters supported the legalisation of same-sex marriage, while 22% opposed it, and 66% of Christian Democratic voters and 56% of Swiss People's Party voters supported same-sex marriage.

A Pew Research Center poll, conducted between April and August 2017 and published in May 2018, showed that 75% of Swiss people supported same-sex marriage, 24% were opposed and 1% did not know or refused to answer. When divided by religion, 89% of religiously unaffiliated people, 80% of non-practicing Christians and 58% of church-attending Christians supported same-sex marriage. Opposition was 16% among 18–34-year-olds.

A public consultation held between March and June 2019 showed wide societal and political support for same-sex marriage in Switzerland. 83% of the participants to the consultation expressed support, and 63% expressed support for sperm donation and access to artificial insemination for lesbian couples.

A February 2020 survey, conducted by the gfs group and requested by Pink Cross, found a 81% majority in favour of same-sex marriage (63% "strongly" supporting and 18% "somewhat" supporting), whereas 18% were opposed (10% "strongly" and 8% "somewhat") and 1% was undecided. By party, 96% of Greens, 92% of Social Democrats and Green Liberals, 77% of Liberals and 67% of Swiss People's Party voters supported same-sex marriage. Adoption was supported by 67% of respondents and access to fertility treatments for lesbian couples by 66%. In November 2020, another poll conducted by the gfs group found that 82% of respondents "strongly" or "somewhat" supported same-sex marriage, 17% were opposed and 1% were undecided; 72% supported adoption and 70% supported access to fertility treatments for lesbian couples.

See also
LGBT rights in Switzerland
Recognition of same-sex unions in Europe

Notes

References

External links
Bundesgesetz über die eingetragene Partnerschaft gleichgeschlechtlicher Paare (Partnerschaftsgesetz, PartG), Fedlex (in German)
Loi fédérale sur le partenariat enregistré entre personnes du même sexe (Loi sur le partenariat, LPart), Fedlex (in French)
Legge federale sull'unione domestica registrata di coppie omosessuali (Legge sull'unione domestica registrata, LUD), Fedlex (in Italian)
 History of the same-sex marriage legislation in the Federal Assembly of Switzerland

LGBT rights in Switzerland
Switzerland
2022 in LGBT history
2022 in Switzerland